The 2019–20 Northwestern Wildcats men's basketball team represented Northwestern University in the 2019–20 NCAA Division I men's basketball season. Led by seventh-year head coach Chris Collins, the Wildcats played their home games at Welsh-Ryan Arena in Evanston, Illinois as members of the Big Ten Conference. They finished the season 8–22, 3–17 to finish in 13th place in Big Ten play. They lost in the first round of the Big Ten tournament to Minnesota.

Previous season
The Wildcats finished the 2018–19 season 13–19, 4–16 in Big Ten play to finish in last place. They lost in the first round of the Big Ten tournament to Illinois.

Offseason

Coaching changes
In March 2019, assistant Billy Donlon was hired as the new head coach at Kansas City. Collins hired Jon Borovich as Donlon's replacement in May 2019.

Departures

Incoming transfers

2019 recruiting class

Roster

Schedule and results

|-
!colspan=9 style=|Exhibition

|-
!colspan=9 style=|Regular season

|-
!colspan=9 style=|Big Ten tournament

Source

References

Northwestern Wildcats
Northwestern Wildcats men's basketball seasons
Northwestern Wild
Northwestern Wild